The 1997 Canadian federal election was held on June 2, 1997, to elect members to the House of Commons of the 36th Parliament of Canada. Prime Minister Jean Chrétien's Liberal Party won a second majority government. The Reform Party replaced the Bloc Québécois as the Official Opposition.

The election results closely followed the pattern of the 1993 election. The Liberals swept Ontario, while the Bloc won a majority in Quebec. Reform made sufficient gains in the West to allow Preston Manning to become leader of the Official Opposition, but lost its only seat east of Manitoba. The most significant change was major gains in Atlantic Canada by the New Democratic Party (NDP) and the rump Progressive Conservative Party.  The Liberal victory was not in doubt, though some commentators on election night were predicting that the party would be cut down to a minority government and that Chrétien might lose his seat. Chrétien narrowly won his riding, and the Liberals maintained a nine-seat majority thanks to gains in Quebec at the expense of the Bloc.  Jean Charest's Tories and Alexa McDonough's NDP both regained official party status in the House of Commons.

This was the first time that five political parties held official party status in a single session of Canada's Parliament, and the only time to date that five different parties have won the popular vote in at least one of the provinces and territories of Canada.

Background
Prime Minister Jean Chrétien announced his approved request by Governor General Roméo LeBlanc to dissolve Parliament on April 26, 1997, with an election to be held on June 2 of that year. Chrétien's election call came three years and five months into Parliament's life, short of both the maximum five year duration and the typical four years between elections. This represented the earliest election call in a majority Parliament since the 1911 election. Opinion polls at the time predicted that the Liberal Party was expected to win a landslide victory capturing at least 180 to 220 of the 301 seats in the House of Commons, with the fragmentation of the opposition meaning that one party was not expected to be able to defeat the government.

The election call was controversial both for being early and for occurring during Manitoba's recovery from the Red River Flood earlier in the year. Reg Alcock and several others inside the Liberal Party had opposed the timing of the vote, and the poor results prompted Paul Martin's supporters to organize against Chrétien.

The election was the first to be held with staggered polling hours across the country. Until 1993, polling hours were 9 a.m. to 8 p.m. in each time zone, with a 4.5-hour difference between closing of polls in Newfoundland and those in British Columbia and Yukon, or a three-hour difference between Quebec-Ontario and B.C.-Yukon. With the new staggered hours, it would be three hours between Newfoundland and B.C.-Yukon, but just 30 minutes between Quebec-Ontario and B.C.-Yukon.

Political Parties

Liberal Party

The Liberal Party under Jean Chrétien campaigned on promising to continue to cut the federal deficit to allow for a budget surplus, and then to spend one half of the surplus on repaying Canada's national debt and cutting taxes while the other half of the surplus would be used to increase funding to health care, assistance for Canadian children in poverty, and job creation. The platform was called Securing Our Future Together. The Liberal Party was attacked by the opposition parties for failing to keep many of the promises that the party campaigned on in the 1993 federal election. The Liberals attacked the Progressive Conservatives and the Reform Party for prematurely calling for tax cuts while a deficit still remained while attacking the New Democratic Party for proposing to increase government spending while Canada faced a deficit.

The Liberals suffered from a number of gaffes in their campaign. In one incident, when Jean Chrétien was questioned by reporters over the cost of the Liberals' election proposal of a national pharmacare program, reporters claimed that Chrétien was unsure of what the cost would be. Chrétien also turned down invitations for interviews by Canada's national media outlets, the Canadian Broadcasting Corporation (CBC) and MuchMusic. In the televised debates between the five major political parties, Chrétien apologized to Canadians for his government having cut funding for social programs to reduce the deficit.

On election day, the Liberals won with a significantly reduced majority.  While they lost much of their support in Atlantic Canada, they won all but two seats in Ontario and improved on their numbers in Quebec.  They were only assured of a majority when the final numbers came in from Western Canada.

Reform Party

The Reform Party under Preston Manning campaigned on preserving national unity through decentralization of multiple federal government powers to all of the provinces, cutting taxes, reducing the size of government, reducing spending, and strongly opposing distinct society status for Quebec.  Feeling that the general acceptance of deficit reduction at the federal and provincial level had been encouraged by their party, Reform saw a chance to finally make the party a national in scope by making political inroads outside of the west, particularly in Ontario. Their platform was titled the Fresh Start for all Canadians. The Reformers ran a full slate of candidates in Quebec, making this the first and last election in which it would run candidates in every region of Canada.

Reform's campaign ran into multiple problems. The party was repeatedly accused by other parties and the media of holding intolerant views due to comments made by a number of Reform MPs during the writ period. Critics had accused the party's performance during the 1993-1997 parliament of being disorganized. Tension between the party's democratic nature and the leader-centric model of modern campaigning led to Manning's leadership abilities being questioned by a number of former members, including Stephen Harper, who accused Manning of inappropriately using a Can$31,000 personal expense allowance as leader. Some Reform supporters were frustrated by the party's decision to expand its political base into Quebec, as they continued to believe that the party should represent English-speaking Canada, and others from the right-wing and populist faction of the party were angry that Manning punished MPs Bob Ringma and David Chatters for outbursts. During the campaign the Reform Party released a controversial television advertisement where the faces of four Quebecers, Prime Minister Jean Chrétien, Bloc Québécois leader Gilles Duceppe, Progressive Conservative leader Jean Charest, and Premier of Quebec Lucien Bouchard, were crossed out, followed by a message saying that Quebec politicians had dominated the federal government for too long and that the Reform Party would end this favoritism towards Quebec. The advertisement was harshly criticized by the other party leaders including accusations that Manning was "intolerant" and a "bigot" for having permitted the advertisement to be aired.

Reform  began the campaign with Can$1.5 million in cash on hand, and had raised a total of Can$8 million.  In contrast to the other parties, the vast majority of the money came from donations by individuals or small businesses.

The results for Reform were a generally considered a  minor tactical success.  The party won 60 seats to displace the Bloc as Official Opposition, largely by building on its already heavy concentration of support in Western Canada. Strategically, Reform failed to make inroads into eastern Canada and lost its one seat in Ontario, leaving it effectively perceived as a Western regional party, despite making their first significant inroads into rural Ontario.

Bloc Québécois

The Bloc Québécois, under the leadership of Gilles Duceppe, lost its position of Official Opposition, falling to third place. The party's founding leader, Lucien Bouchard, had resigned in the aftermath of the 1995 Quebec referendum in order to become Premier of Quebec. Bouchard had been replaced by Michel Gauthier, but a lack of direction and party infighting caused their poll numbers to plummet, leaving them in danger of being overhauled by both the Liberals and the resurgent Progressive Conservatives. Duceppe, who took over as leader after Gauthier resigned, nonetheless made progress by emphasizing the lack of possibility of constitutional reform. While the party only finished 1.2 percentage points ahead of the Liberals in the province's popular vote, a more efficiently-distributed vote (the Liberal vote was too concentrated in and around Montreal; elsewhere, they split the vote with the Progressive Conservatives) still allowed them capture a comfortable majority of 44 out of Quebec's 75 seats.

New Democratic Party

The New Democratic Party under the leadership of Alexa McDonough regained official party status that the party lost in the 1993 Canadian federal election. The party won the fourth largest share of total votes and won 21 seats.  Notably, the party made a substantial showing in Atlantic Canada, a region where it had only elected three MPs in its entire history prior to the election.

Progressive Conservative Party

The Progressive Conservative Party under Jean Charest campaigned on securing national unity in Canada by recognizing Quebec as being a distinct society within Canada, along with the proposal of a "New Covenant" for Canadian confederation to be negotiated between the Federal and Provincial governments. The party's platform included the novelty of being publicly distributed on CD-ROM.  Charest and the PCs benefited from rapidly rising in popularity amongst all language groups in Quebec, where voters were found to have preferred Charest over Gilles Duceppe, the leader of the Bloc Québécois.

The Progressive Conservatives faced multiple difficulties, as the party was not able to apply for federal financial assistance due to it not being an official party. The party's results in their previous bastion of Western Canada remained anemic, and the Reformers remained the dominant conservative political force in the west. Reform also made inroads into rural central and southern Ontario — traditionally the heartland of the Tories' provincial counterparts.

The Progressive Conservatives won the third largest number of the total votes and improved their situation in the House of Commons, regaining official party status after winning 20 seats. Despite finishing  about half a point behind Reform in the nationwide popular vote, their only heavy concentrations of support was in Atlantic Canada and Quebec. Elsewhere, like in 1993, their support was too spread out to translate into victories in individual ridings. They only won one seat each in Ontario and Manitoba.  The result, a disappointment for Charest, would lead to his eventual resignation and assumption of leadership of the Liberal Party of Quebec.

Green Party
Support for the Green Party of Canada was 79% higher than at the previous election, with its greatest success in British Columbia, where it received 2% of the vote.  The Green Party remained almost entirely off the national media's radar.  At 0.43% of the vote, and 1.64% of the vote in the ridings it contested, the Green Party remained a small but growing movement.

Results

|- style="background-color:#CCCCCC"
! style="text-align:center;" rowspan="2" colspan="2"|Party
! style="text-align:center;" rowspan="2"|Party Leader
! style="text-align:center;" rowspan="2"|Candidates
! style="text-align:center;" colspan="4"|Seats
! style="text-align:center;" colspan="3"|Popular vote
|- style="background-color:#CCCCCC"
| style="text-align:center;" |1993
| style="text-align:center;" |Dissol.
| style="text-align:center;" |Elected
| style="text-align:center;" |% Change
| style="text-align:center;" |#
| style="text-align:center;" |%
| style="text-align:center;" |Change

| style="text-align:left;" | Jean Chrétien
| style="text-align:right;" |301
| style="text-align:right;" |177
| style="text-align:right;" |174
| style="text-align:right;" |155
| style="text-align:right;" |-12.4%
| style="text-align:right;" |4,994,277
| style="text-align:right;" |38.46%
| style="text-align:right;" |-2.78pp

| style="text-align:left;" | Preston Manning
| style="text-align:right;" |227
| style="text-align:right;" |52
| style="text-align:right;" |50
| style="text-align:right;" |60
| style="text-align:right;" |+15.4%
| style="text-align:right;" |2,513,080
| style="text-align:right;" |19.35%
| style="text-align:right;" |+0.66pp

| style="text-align:left;" | Gilles Duceppe
| style="text-align:right;" |75
| style="text-align:right;" |54
| style="text-align:right;" |50
| style="text-align:right;" |44
| style="text-align:right;" |-18.5%
| style="text-align:right;" |1,385,821
| style="text-align:right;" |10.67%
| style="text-align:right;" |-2.85pp

| style="text-align:left;" | Alexa McDonough
| style="text-align:right;" |301
| style="text-align:right;" |9
| style="text-align:right;" |9
| style="text-align:right;" |21
| style="text-align:right;" |+133.3%
| style="text-align:right;" |1,434,509
| style="text-align:right;" |11.05%
| style="text-align:right;" |+4.17pp

| style="text-align:left;" | Jean Charest
| style="text-align:right;" |301
| style="text-align:right;" |2
| style="text-align:right;" |2
| style="text-align:right;" |20
| style="text-align:right;" |+900%
| style="text-align:right;" |2,446,705
| style="text-align:right;" |18.84%
| style="text-align:right;" |+2.80pp

| style="text-align:left;" colspan="2"|Independent and No Affiliation
| style="text-align:right;" |76
| style="text-align:right;" |1
| style="text-align:right;" |6
| style="text-align:right;" |1
| style="text-align:right;" | 
| style="text-align:right;" |60,759
| style="text-align:right;" |0.47%
| style="text-align:right;" |-0.09pp

| style="text-align:left;" | Joan Russow
| style="text-align:right;" |79
| style="text-align:right;" |-
| style="text-align:right;" |-
| style="text-align:right;" |-
| style="text-align:right;" |-
| style="text-align:right;" |55,583
| style="text-align:right;" |0.43%
| style="text-align:right;" |+0.18pp

| style="text-align:left;" | Neil Paterson
| style="text-align:right;" |136
| style="text-align:right;" |-
| style="text-align:right;" |-
| style="text-align:right;" |-
| style="text-align:right;" |-
| style="text-align:right;" |37,085
| style="text-align:right;" |0.29%
| style="text-align:right;" |+x

| style="text-align:left;" | Ron Gray
| style="text-align:right;" |53
| style="text-align:right;" |-
| style="text-align:right;" |-
| style="text-align:right;" |-
| style="text-align:right;" |-
| style="text-align:right;" |29,085
| style="text-align:right;" |0.22%
| style="text-align:right;" |+x

| style="text-align:left;" | Paul T. Hellyer
| style="text-align:right;" |58
| style="text-align:right;" |*
| style="text-align:right;" |-
| style="text-align:right;" |-
| style="text-align:right;" |*
| style="text-align:right;" |17,502
| style="text-align:right;" |0.13%
| style="text-align:right;" |*

| style="text-align:left;" | Hardial Bains
| style="text-align:right;" |65
| style="text-align:right;" |-
| style="text-align:right;" |-
| style="text-align:right;" |-
| style="text-align:right;" |-
| style="text-align:right;" |11,468
| style="text-align:right;" |0.09%
| style="text-align:right;" |+0.05pp
|-

| style="text-align:left;" colspan="4" |Vacant
| style="text-align:right;" |4
| style="text-align:center;" colspan="5" | 
|-
| style="text-align:left;" colspan="3"|Total
| style="text-align:right;" |1,672
| style="text-align:right;" |295
| style="text-align:right;" |295
| style="text-align:right;" |301
| style="text-align:right;" |+2.0%
| style="text-align:right;" |12,985,974
| style="text-align:right;" |100%
| style="text-align:right;" | 
|-
| style="text-align:center;" colspan="11" |Sources: http://www.elections.ca History of Federal Ridings since 1867
|-
|}
Notes:

*: Party did not nominate candidates in the previous election.

x: Less than 0.005% of the popular vote

Vote and seat summaries

Results by province

Source: Elections Canada

Notes
 Number of parties: 10
 First appearance: Canadian Action Party
 Final appearance: Reform Party of Canada
 Final appearance before hiatus: Christian Heritage Party of Canada (returned in 2004)
 1997 was one of only three elections in Canadian history (the others were 1993 and 2008) where the official Opposition did not have the majority of the opposition's seats. 60 seats were held by the Reform Party, yet 86 seats for the other opposition parties and independents combined. 
 1997 was the only election to date in which five different parties won the popular vote in a province or territory (the Liberals won in Manitoba, Newfoundland and Labrador, the Northwest Territories, Ontario and Prince Edward Island; Reform in Alberta, British Columbia and Saskatchewan; the BQ in Quebec; the NDP in the Yukon Territory; and the PCs in New Brunswick and Nova Scotia). Consequently, it was also the last time the PCs won a province or territory.

10 closest ridings

 Sackville—Eastern Shore, NS: Peter Stoffer, NDP def. Ken Streatch, PC by 41 votes
 Bellechasse—Etchemins—Montmagny—L'Islet, QC: Gilbert Normand, Lib def. François Langlois, BQ by 47 votes
 Selkirk—Interlake, MB: Howard Hilstrom, Ref def. Jon Gerrard, Lib by 66 votes
 Cardigan, PE: Lawrence MacAulay, Lib def. Dan Hughes, PC by 99 votes
 Bonaventure—Gaspé—Îles-de-la-Madeleine—Pabok, QC: Yvan Bernier, BQ def. Patrick Gagnon, Lib by 179 votes
 Saskatoon—Humboldt, SK: Jim Pankiw, Ref def. Dennis Gruending, NDP by 220 votes
 Humber—St. Barbe—Baie Verte, NF: Gerry Byrne, Lib def. Art Bull, PC by 232 votes
 Chicoutimi, QC: André Harvey, PC def. Gilbert Fillion, BQ by 317 votes
 Frontenac—Mégantic, QC: Jean-Guy Chrétien, BQ def. Manon Lecours, Lib by 465 votes
 Simcoe—Grey, ON: Paul Bonwick, Lib def. Paul Shaw, Ref by 481 votes

See also
 
 List of Canadian federal general elections
 List of political parties in Canada
Articles on parties' candidates in this election:

 Independents
 Canadian Action
 Christian Heritage
 Greens
 Independent Rhinoceros
 Liberals
 Marxist-Leninists
 Natural Law
 New Democrats
 Progressive Conservatives
 Reform Party

References

Further reading

External links
 Elections Canada: 1997 election
 Transcript of English Leader's debate
 Predicting the 1997 Canadian Election